The men's 800 metres at the 2003 All-Africa Games were held on October 12–13.

Medalists

Results

Heats
Qualification: First 2 of each heat (Q) and the next 2 fastest (q) qualified for the semifinal.

Final

References
Results
Results

800